Samuel Wilson, more commonly known as Sam Wilson, is a fictional character portrayed by Anthony Mackie in the Marvel Cinematic Universe (MCU) media franchise, based on the Marvel Comics character of the same name and known commonly by his original alias, the Falcon. Wilson is depicted as a veteran United States Air Force Pararescueman who flies using a jet pack with articulated wings, and a close friend and ally of Steve Rogers. He later joins the Avengers and, following Rogers' retirement, is personally appointed by him to become his successor, receiving Rogers' shield and the title of Captain America.

Wilson is a central figure in the MCU, having appeared in six films  and taking a lead role in the miniseries The Falcon and the Winter Soldier (2021). The character is noted for being the first black Captain America in the MCU, and Mackie's portrayal of Wilson has been met with positive reception. He is set to reprise the role in the film Captain America: New World Order (2024), currently in development.

Concept, creation, and characterization
Samuel Thomas Wilson, known as the Falcon, was the first African-American superhero in mainstream comic books. The character first appeared in Captain America #117 (Sept. 1969). Created by writer-editor Stan Lee and artist Gene Colan, he came about, Colan recalled in 2008,

He was introduced as an unnamed former resident of New York City's Harlem neighborhood, who had adopted a wild falcon he trained and named Redwing. (His own name, Sam Wilson, was not given until page five of the following issue.) After Wilson came into conflict with the supervillain the Red Skull, Steve Rogers inspired Wilson to take on the costumed identity of the Falcon, and Wilson underwent training with Rogers. Through most of the 1970s, the Falcon and Captain America were a team in New York City, and the series was cover-billed Captain America and the Falcon from issues #134–192 and 194–222 (February 1971 – June 1978).

The Falcon eventually became a member of the Avengers from issues #183–194 (May 1979 – April 1980), and had a solo issue. After regularly appearing in Captain America vol. 2 (November 1996 – November 1997), the Falcon rejoined the Avengers in The Avengers vol. 3, #1 (February 1998). This time, he remained with the team, becoming one of its most prominent members by issue #57 (Oct. 2002). In 2014, Marvel announced that Wilson would succeed Rogers as the new Captain America, a mantle which the character thereafter assumed in several additional runs.

In the mid-2000s, Kevin Feige realized that Marvel still owned the rights to the core members of the Avengers, which included Captain America and his associated characters, including Wilson. Feige, a self-professed "fanboy", envisioned creating a shared universe just as creators Stan Lee and Jack Kirby had done with their comic books in the early 1960s. In 2005, Marvel received a $525 million investment from Merrill Lynch, allowing them to independently produce ten films, including Captain America. Paramount Pictures agreed to distribute the film.
In July 2012, Anthony Mackie entered negotiations to star as Wilson/Falcon alongside Chris Evans in Captain America: The Winter Soldier.  In November 2014, Mackie was confirmed to be returning in Captain America: Civil War. In early July 2015, an international teaser trailer revealed that Mackie would appear as Wilson/Falcon in Ant-Man. Mackie appears in the post-credit sequence as well, along with Chris Evans and Sebastian Stan as Steve Rogers / Captain America and Bucky Barnes / Winter Soldier, respectively.

Characterization
Entering the role, Mackie said "[Wilson is] a really smart guy who went through major military training and becomes a tactical leader." He also remarked, "He's the first African-American superhero. It makes me feel all the work I've done has been paying off. I have a son, nephews and nieces, and I love the idea that they can dress up as the Falcon on Halloween. They now have someone they can idolize. That's a huge honor for me." Marvel, who cast Mackie because of his "energy and sense of fun", did not let him read a script before signing on. Mackie spent five months doing two-a-day workouts and eating an 11,000 calorie per day diet to get into shape for the role. Commenting on Rogers' relationship with Wilson, Evans said, "Meeting Mackie's character, he used to serve, now he works at the VA counseling guys who come home with PTSD — they connect on that level. I think they're both wounded warriors who don't bleed on other people. Cap has no one to bleed on. I think Mackie knows how to handle people like that. … Sometimes when things are bad, trusting a stranger is the way to go".

On including Falcon in Ant-Man, director Peyton Reed said that it was not done just to include the character, rather "[i]t served a plot point; a purpose in our story" and allowed them to enhance Michael Peña's "tip montages", which were written by production writers Gabriel Ferrari and Andrew Barrer, also adding Falcon "seemed like the right character — not a marquee character like Iron Man or Thor, but the right level of hero". Rudd and McKay decided to include Falcon after watching Captain America: The Winter Soldier.

Discussing the relationship between Wilson and Rogers in Captain America: Civil War, Mackie said, "With Falcon and Cap, what's so great is there's a mutual respect. There's a soldier respect. What's great about ... [Captain America: Civil War] is you get to see their relationship grow," adding, "He respects and admires Cap because Cap earned his rank as opposed to sitting in an office and just delegating orders." Feige said that it was decided to reshoot the final scene of the film to incorporate the new Falcon suit designed for Ant-Man, which was released after Age of Ultron, as Falcon was originally shot in his original suit from The Winter Soldier. Mackie stated he did not realize Wilson had become an Avenger until he watched the film at the premiere, as he was only given the script for the scenes he worked on.

Wilson uses a pair of submachine guns as his main weapons and flies using a jet pack with articulated wings. From Civil War on, he is aided by a robotic drone named Redwing.  Joe Russo stated that the inclusion of Barnes to Rogers' side forces Wilson to question the dynamic and relationship he has with Rogers going forward. Mackie noted that in Infinity War, Wilson has a grudge with other heroes like Iron Man and Black Panther after the events of Civil War.

Fictional character biography

Early life and military service
Wilson was born and raised in Delacroix, Louisiana, where his family operated a fishing business. He later became a United States Air Force (USAF) Pararescueman and served multiple tours in overseas military campaigns. He was selected to test a prototype military wingsuit alongside his friend Riley due to insurgents' use of RPGs preventing the use of helicopters. However, Riley was killed by an RPG and Wilson was unable to save him. After ending his Air Force service, Wilson became a trauma counselor aiding other returning veterans.

Helping Steve Rogers

In 2014, Wilson befriends Steve Rogers while jogging at Washington, D.C. and later helps him and Natasha Romanoff defeat Hydra. After receiving help from Maria Hill and Nick Fury, the trio travel to S.H.I.E.L.D.'s headquarters, the Triskelion, where they engage Bucky Barnes, who Hydra brainwashed and turned into the Winter Soldier, and Brock Rumlow. In the aftermath, Wilson offers to accompany Rogers in his mission to track down Barnes.

New Avenger

In 2015, Wilson attends the Avengers' party at Avengers Tower in New York City to report back on his progress in finding Barnes to Rogers. Soon after, Wilson is recruited into the Avengers' new roster at the Avengers Compound alongside Wanda Maximoff, Vision, and James Rhodes.

A few months later, Wilson has a brief altercation with Scott Lang outside the Compound, where Lang takes a device necessary for his own mission. Wilson, impressed by Lang, starts looking for him.

Sokovia Accords

In 2016, Wilson accompanies Rogers, Romanoff, and Maximoff on a mission in Lagos to stop Rumlow from obtaining a biological weapon. While there, Wilson debuts a bird-shaped robotic drone he has nicknamed Redwing. Later, he becomes the first Avenger to oppose the Sokovia Accords, a new law requiring the Avengers to be supervised by the United Nations that Rogers opposes but Tony Stark supports.
After Barnes is framed for a bombing in Vienna, Rogers and Wilson attempt to protect Barnes, only to be arrested. When the true perpetrator of the bombing, Helmut Zemo, sets Barnes loose on the Avengers, Barnes tells Rogers and Wilson about five other supersoldiers that he believes Zemo wants to unleash. At Wilson's suggestion, Rogers calls Clint Barton to recruit Lang and retrieve Maximoff. In Germany, they face off against Stark's faction of Avengers, with Wilson and most of Rogers' team agreeing to stay behind and allow themselves to be captured so Rogers and Barnes can pursue Zemo. Wilson and the captured Avengers are incarcerated at the Raft prison, where Stark convinces Wilson to tell him where Rogers and Barnes went in exchange for Stark going alone. Sometime later, Rogers breaks his allies out of the Raft and they go into hiding due to violating the accords.

Infinity War and resurrection

In 2018, Wilson, Rogers, and Romanoff arrive in Scotland to rescue Maximoff and Vision from Proxima Midnight and Corvus Glaive, two of the Children of Thanos. The Avengers return to the Compound and meet with Rhodes and Bruce Banner, before heading to Wakanda. There they try to protect Vision before facing off with the Outriders. The Avengers later try to stop Thanos upon his arrival from completing the Infinity Gauntlet, but are unable too, and Wilson falls victim to the Blip.

In 2023, Wilson is restored to life and is brought by Masters of the Mystic Arts to the ruins of the Compound to join the battle against an alternate Thanos. A week later, Wilson attends Stark's funeral. The next day, with Barnes' approval, he receives Captain America's shield and mantle from an elderly Rogers.

Becoming Captain America

In 2024, Wilson has returned to work as a contractor with the USAF with support from his friend, USAF first lieutenant Joaquin Torres. In Washington, D.C., Wilson gives the shield to the U.S. government so it can be displayed in a Smithsonian exhibit dedicated to Captain America, believing that he is not worthy of taking up Captain America's mantle. He returns to Delacroix to help his sister, Sarah, with the family business until Torres tells of him an attack carried out by the Flag Smashers, a terrorist group that believes life was better during the Blip. Wilson later learns that the U.S. government has named John Walker the new Captain America.

Partnering with Bucky Barnes

Wilson is approached by Barnes, who expresses disapproval that the former surrendered the shield before joining him in facing the Flag Smashers and their leader Karli Morgenthau in Munich, only to discover they all have superhuman strength. Despite receiving aid from Walker and Lemar Hoskins, Wilson and Barnes are overpowered and the terrorists escape. Walker requests the pair join him in aiding the Global Repatriation Council (GRC) to quash the ongoing violent post-Blip revolutions, but they decline and head to Baltimore to meet Isaiah Bradley, a Korean War veteran and super-soldier whom Barnes encountered in battle decades prior, to find out how the Flag Smashers obtained super-solder serum. However, Bradley refuses to help them, revealing he was imprisoned and experimented on by the government for thirty years. Barnes convinces Wilson to travel to Berlin and meet with the imprisoned Zemo in an effort to obtain information about the Flag Smashers, during which Barnes secretly orchestrates Zemo's escape. Despite his reluctance, Wilson joins Barnes and Zemo in traveling to Madripoor under assumed names to locate the source of the new super-soldier serum. They learn from high-ranking criminal, Selby, that the Power Broker hired former Hydra scientist Dr. Wilfred Nagel to recreate the serum before the trio is compromised and Selby is killed. The trio are saved by the fugitive Sharon Carter, who agrees to help them after Wilson offers to get her pardoned. They travel to Nagel's lab and confront him, learning that he created twenty vials of the serum before the Flag Smashers stole them. After Zemo kills Nagel and bounty hunters destroy the latter's lab, Wilson, Barnes, and Carter fight the bounty hunters until Zemo acquires a getaway car to help them escape. While Carter stays behind, Wilson, Barnes, and Zemo travel to Latvia to find Morgenthau.

Stopping the Flag Smashers

Wilson attempts to persuade Morgenthau to end the violence, but an impatient unstable Walker interrupts and she escapes. After she threatens Sarah, Wilson meets with Morgenthau, during which she asks him to join her movement. Walker and Hoskins intervene, leading to a fight in which Morgenthau accidentally kills Hoskins. Enraged by his friend's death and having taken the serum, Walker uses Captain America's shield to kill one of the Flag Smashers in front of a group of horrified bystanders, who film his actions.

Following this, Wilson and Barnes demand the shield from Walker, starting a fight in which Walker destroys Wilson's wingsuit before Wilson and Barnes narrowly take the shield back. After passing on his wingsuit to Torres, Wilson revisits Bradley, but the latter states his belief that a black man cannot, and should not, be Captain America. Wilson returns home to Louisiana and helps fix the family boat, with assistance from several locals as well as Barnes, who delivers a new Captain America suit he acquired from the Wakandans to Wilson. While training with the shield, Wilson and Barnes agree to move on from their pasts and work together as friends.

Accepting his role as the new Captain America and after receiving a lead from Torres, Wilson flies to New York to save the GRC from the Flag Smashers with help from Barnes, Carter, and Walker. Wilson attempts to reason with Morgenthau, but Carter kills her when she points a gun at him. After carrying out Morgenthau's body, Wilson convinces the GRC to postpone their impending vote to force the relocation of Blip-displaced individuals and make efforts to help them instead. He also convinces the government to create a statue honoring Bradley as part of the Smithsonian's Captain America exhibit. Afterward, Wilson returns home and joins his family, Barnes, and his community for a cookout.

Alternate versions

Zombie outbreak 

In an alternate 2018, Wilson became infected by a quantum virus that turned him into a zombie. The zombified Wilson later attacks Bucky Barnes and Okoye at Grand Central Terminal before being killed by the latter.

Differences from the comic books

A number of differences have been observed between the comic book version of the character and the MCU adaptation. The character's comic book backstory is dispensed with entirely, with Wilson instead being introduced with a military background, an aspect that originated from the Ultimate comics through which he is able to relate to Rogers. In the comic book, Wilson has the ability to communicate with birds and is assisted in his heroics by an actual falcon named Redwing. In the films, this is replaced by a drone nicknamed Redwing, which the character is able to control remotely. Wilson's costume is also dramatically different from the bare-chested skintight outfit worn by the character in the comics, instead wearing a utilitarian outfit inspired by the Ultimate Marvel version, though Mackie has indicated that he wanted to wear "red Spandex, head to toe" for the part.

In The Falcon and the Winter Soldier, he wears a red-and silver costume that is closer to the comics. While fighting the Flag Smashers and John Walker however, the former destroys his Redwing drone while the latter destroys his flight suit. Following these, Barnes convinces Ayo of Wakanda's Dora Milaje to arrange for the construction of a replacement flight suit made of vibranium and equipped with a pair of Redwing drones.

Reception

Critical response
The response to the character of Wilson was mixed, with Jacob Stolworthy of The Independent feeling he was "memorable solely due to the vibrancy the entertaining actor [Mackie] brings to the role." However, Mackie's portrayal of Wilson was widely praised, with Matt Donnelly of Variety noting his "winning tone" and "wry and collegial humour" in the role. Andy Welch of The Guardian praised Wilson's speech to the Global Repatriation Council as Wilson's "greatest moment" in the final episode of The Falcon and the Winter Soldier, adding that there were "plenty of miles left" in Wilson's partnership with Sebastian Stan's Bucky Barnes.

Awards and nominations

See also
 Captain America in other media
 Characters of the Marvel Cinematic Universe

References

External links
 Sam Wilson on the Marvel Cinematic Universe Wiki
 
 Sam Wilson on Marvel.com

African-American superheroes
Alternative versions of Captain America
American male characters in television
Avengers (film series)
Black characters in films
Captain America (film series)
Fictional War in Afghanistan (2001–2021) veterans
Fictional United States Air Force personnel
Fictional characters displaced in time
Fictional characters from Louisiana
Fictional military personnel in films
Fictional shield fighters
Fictional social workers
Fictional soldiers
Fictional vigilantes
Film characters introduced in 2014
Male characters in film
Male characters in television
Marvel Cinematic Universe characters
Marvel Comics American superheroes
Marvel Comics male superheroes
Marvel Comics military personnel
Superhero television characters
The Falcon and the Winter Soldier
United States-themed superheroes